Al-Quds Brigades (AQB) (Saraya al-Quds meaning Jerusalem Brigades) is the armed wing of the Palestinian Islamist organization Palestinian Islamic Jihad (PIJ), which is the second largest group in the Gaza Strip, after Hamas. AQB's leader is Ziyad al-Nakhalah, based in Damascus, Syria. The head of AQB in the Gaza Strip was Baha Abu al-Ata until he was killed in November 2019.

AQB's parent organization, PIJ, is devoted to the establishment of an Islamic state, and the settlement of Palestinians in what it considers their rightful homeland within the geographic borders of the pre-1948 British-mandated Palestine. It refuses to participate in political processes or negotiations about a swap of Israeli and Palestinian settlements. The PIJ is majority funded by Iran.

History
Al-Quds Brigades was founded in 1981 by Fathi Shaqaqi and Abd Al Aziz Awda in Gaza, and has been active in the West Bank and the Gaza Strip, especially in the town of Jenin. Awda was designated a "Specially Designated Terrorist" by United States on 23 January 1995, and Shiqaqi was assassinated in Malta on 26 October 1995. 

The group undertook numerous attacks on Israeli civilians, including suicide bombings; and has suffered extensive operations against its infrastructure carried out by the Israel Defense Forces (IDF), which resulted in severe losses to the group, and it appeared significantly weakened by 2004. 

On 1 March 2006, Abu al-Walid al-Dahdouh, an AQB commander, was targeted and killed by an Israeli air strike in Gaza City as he drove past the Palestinian finance ministry. On 30 August 2006, the AQB West Bank leader, Hussam Jaradat, was shot and killed by undercover IDF in Jenin on 30 August 2006.

In the Gaza Strip, al-Quds Brigades continued its militant activities, including the indiscriminate firing of al-Quds rocket attacks out of populated civilian areas. Al-Quds Brigades promotes the military destruction of Israel, including the indiscriminate firing of rocket, mortar fire and suicide bombings. The international community considers the use of indiscriminate attacks on civilian populations and the use of human shields illegal under international law.

In March 2014, over 100 rockets were launched into southern Israel by PIJ and other Islamist groups. On 14 March, Ramadan Shalah, the then leader of PIJ, announced that the attack was coordinated with Hamas.

Baha Abu al-Ata, the head of AQB in the Gaza Strip, was killed in a targeted killing in Gaza City on 12 November 2019, allegedly after having given orders for the launching of rockets into Israel. At the same time, Syrian media reported that another senior PIJ commander, Akram al-Ajouri, survived an airstrike in Damascus, but his son and daughter were killed. The next day, AQB launched more than 220 rockets into southern and central Israel, and on the next day the IDF struck several PIJ targets in the Gaza Strip killing two Palestinians, identified as 38-year-old Khaled Moawad Faraj,  AQB's field commander, and 32-year-old Alaa Ashtyawu. Later that day, three more AQB members were killed in an Israeli Air Force airstrike while attempting to launch rockets into Israel. A ceasefire was agreed for 14 November, by which time AQB had launched over 400 rockets into Israel and a total of 36 Palestinians had been killed, including 25 members of PIJ or other factions in the Strip. This time, Hamas made no effort to stand with or assist PIJ.

References

External links
سرايا القدس (Saraya al-Quds)

Jihadist groups
Military wings of political parties
Islamic Jihad Movement in Palestine
Palestinian militant groups
Military units and formations established in 1981
1981 establishments in the Israeli Military Governorate